Sergey Alikovich Arakelov (born 18 July 1957) is a retired Russian heavyweight weightlifter. Between 1978 and 1982 he won two world titles and set five world records: two in the snatch, two in the clean and jerk and one in the total. While competing at the 1979 World Championships Arakelov severely injured his shoulder and recovered only by 1982. He retired in 1983 due to another injury. 

After retiring from competitions Arakelov graduated in economics and served as a sports functionary. His uncle Yuri Radonyak was an Olympic medalist in boxing; his father was also a boxer and his mother competed in rhythmic gymnastics.

Controversies 
In 2015, in an ongoing court case, Arakelov was accused of being a pedophile and sexually harassing his then 3 year old granddaughter, with several experts confirming the fact.

References 

1957 births
Living people
Sportspeople from Krasnodar
Russian male weightlifters
Soviet male weightlifters
European Weightlifting Championships medalists
World Weightlifting Championships medalists